Leiradira is a genus of beetles in the family Carabidae, containing the following species:

 Leiradira alternans Darlington, 1953
 Leiradira alticola Darlington, 1961
 Leiradira auricollis Castelnau, 1867
 Leiradira aurifer Darlington, 1961
 Leiradira blandula Tschitscherine, 1898
 Leiradira jacobi Darlington, 1961
 Leiradira latreillei Castelnau, 1867
 Leiradira opacistriatis (Sloane, 1902)
 Leiradira puella Tschitscherine, 1898
 Leiradira soror Darlington, 1961
 Leiradira tenuis Darlington, 1961
 Leiradira violacea (Straneo, 1953)

References

Pterostichinae